Manjul (born 1971) is an Indian political cartoonist. After working with major Indian publications like Dainik jagran, Rashtriya Sahara, Financial Express, India Today, The Economic Times and Daily News and Analysis currently he is contributing for various Indian publications & websites. He is also a winner of Maya Kamath Memorial Awards for Excellence in Cartooning 2009.

Manjul awarded Newsmakers Achievers Awards in 2022.

Work

Cartoons
 Irregular, Daily pocket cartoon column about political & social events appears in Daily News and Analysis
 Nobody's Business, Daily pocket cartoon column about office humour appears in DNA Money, Daily News and Analysis
 Toon In, Twice a week editorial cartoon column appears in Daily News and Analysis
 Like That Only, Once a week comic strip appears in Daily News and Analysis, Saturday edition
 Politickle, Once a week display cartoon appears in Daily News and Analysis, Sunday edition
 First Cut, Daily editorial cartoon in FirstPost.
 Mumbai Meri Jaan, Daily cartoon in Mid-Day.
 Syndicated cartoons in various newspapers.

Books

References 

Indian editorial cartoonists
Indian male artists
Living people
1971 births
Artists from Mumbai